The following is a list of the major events in the history of German idealism, along with related historical events.

Events

Background
1623 Jakob Böhme, The Way to Christ (see: Behmenism)
1641 René Descartes, Meditations on First Philosophy (see: Modern Rationalism, Cartesianism)
1677 Spinoza, Ethica Ordine Geometrico Demonstrata (see: Spinozism, Philosophy of Spinoza)
1686 Leibniz, Discourse on Metaphysics
1687 Newton, Philosophiæ Naturalis Principia Mathematica ("Mathematical Principles of Natural Philosophy")
1690 Locke, An Essay Concerning Human Understanding (see: British Empiricism)
1710 Berkeley, Three Dialogues between Hylas and Philonous (see: Subjective idealism)
1732 Wolff, Elementa matheseos universae (influenced Kant)
1748 Hume, An Enquiry Concerning Human Understanding
1759 Hamann, Socratic Memorabilia (see: Counter-Enlightenment)
1762 Rousseau, Emile, or On Education (see: Age of Enlightenment)

1770-1800
 1770 Kant, inaugural dissertation
1781 
Kant, Critique of Pure Reason (see: Transcendental idealism)
Death of Lessing
1783 Kant, Prolegomena to Any Future Metaphysics
1784 Kant, "Answering the Question: What Is Enlightenment?"
1785 
Jacobi, Letters on the Teachings of Spinoza 
includes unauthorized publication of Goethe's poem "Prometheus". (see: Pantheism controversy, Sturm und Drang)
Kant, Groundwork of the Metaphysics of Morals
1786 Reinhold, Letters on the Kantian Philosophy
1787 
Second edition of Kant's Critique of Pure Reason
Jacobi, David Hume on Faith, or Idealism and Realism
Goethe, Iphigenia in Tauris (see: Weimar Classicism)
1788 Kant, Critique of Practical Reason
1789 
French Revolution begins
Second, expanded edition of Jacobi's Letters on the Teachings of Spinoza
1790 
Kant, Critique of Judgment
Maimon, "Essay on Transcendental Philosophy"
Goethe, Metamorphosis of Plants
1792 
Fichte, Attempt at a Critique of All Revelation
Schulze, Aenesidemus
1793 Kant, Religion within the Limits of Reason Alone
1794 Fichte, Aenesidemus Review and Foundations of the Science of Knowledge
1795 Schiller, On the Aesthetic Education of Man
1797 
Fichte, Foundations of Natural Right
Kant, Metaphysics of Morals
"The Oldest Systematic Program of German Idealism" (unsigned and unpublished essay written by Hegel, Schelling, and/or Hölderlin.)
Schelling, Ideas for a Philosophy of Nature (see: Naturphilosophie)
1798 Schelling, On the World Soul
1799 
Napoleon overthrows the French Directory
Jacobi, Letter to Fichte (see: Atheism dispute)
Schleiermacher, On Religion (see: German Romanticism, Hermeneutics)
Schelling, First Plan of a System of the Philosophy of Nature

1800-1830
1800 
Schelling, System of Transcendental Idealism
Fichte, The Vocation of Man
1801 Hegel, The Difference Between Fichte's and Schelling's Systems of Philosophy
1804 Death of Kant
1807 Hegel, The Phenomenology of Spirit (see: Absolute idealism)
1808 Goethe, Faust: The First Part of the Tragedy
1809 Schelling, Philosophical Inquiries into the Essence of Human Freedom
1810 Goethe, Theory of Colours 
1811 Jacobi, Of Divine Things and Their Revelation (criticized Schelling)
1812 Hegel, Science of Logic part one ('The Objective Logic', part 1)
1813 Hegel, Science of Logic part two ('The Objective Logic', part 2)
1814 
Death of Fichte
Defeat of Napoleon; Bourbon Restoration
1815 Schelling, On the Divinities of Samothrace (see: Winged Victory of Samothrace)
1816 Hegel, Science of Logic part three ('The Subjective Logic')  
1817 
Hegel, Encyclopedia of the Philosophical Sciences
Coleridge, Biographia Literaria (discusses Kant, Fichte, Schelling in English)
1818 Schopenhauer, The World as Will and Representation
1820 Hegel, Elements of the Philosophy of Right
1825 Herbart, Psychology as Science

1830s-1860s
1830 Revolutions of 1830
1831 Death of Hegel
1832 
Goethe, Faust: The Second Part of the Tragedy
Death of Goethe
1833 Karl Daub, The Dogmatic Theology of the Present Time (see: Right Hegelians)
1834 
Carlyle, Sartor Resartus (English novel which parodied German idealism)
Schelling's first public critique of Hegel is published in an introduction to a work by Victor Cousin
1835 
Strauss, The Life of Jesus (see: Young Hegelians)
Heine, On the History of Religion and Philosophy in Germany
Hegel's posthumously published Lectures on Aesthetics
1837 
Schopenhauer, On the Basis of Morality
Hegel's Lectures on the Philosophy of History
1839 Schopenhauer, On the Freedom of the Will
1841 
Schelling's Berlin lectures are attended by Søren Kierkegaard, Mikhail Bakunin, Jacob Burckhardt, Alexander von Humboldt, and Friedrich Engels
Kierkegaard, On the Concept of Irony with Continual Reference to Socrates (critiques Fichte, Schlegel, and Hegel)
Feuerbach, The Essence of Christianity
1842 Bruno Bauer, Hegel's Teachings on Religion and Art
1843
Trendelenburg, The Logical Question in Hegel's System
Marx, Critique of Hegel's Philosophy of Right (unpublished until after Marx's death)
Lotze, Logic
1844
Second expanded edition of Schopenhauer's The World as Will and Representation
Marx and Engels, The Holy Family criticized the Young Hegelians
1846 Marx and Engels, The German Ideology (unpublished until 1932) criticized the Young Hegelians
1848 Revolutions of 1848
1851 Schopenhauer, Parerga and Paralipomena
1854 Death of Schelling

Later
1860 Death of Schopenhauer
1865
Stirling, The Secret of Hegel: Being the Hegelian System in Origin Principle, Form and Matter (see: British idealism)
Lange, History of Materialism and Critique of its Present Importance (neo-Kantian work)
1874 Nietzsche, Schopenhauer as Educator
1885 Josiah Royce, The Religious Aspect of Philosophy (see: Objective idealism)
1903 G. E. Moore, "The Refutation of Idealism" (see: Analytic philosophy)
1907 Benedetto Croce, What is Living and What is Dead in the Philosophy of Hegel
1912 Paul Tillich, Mysticism and Guilt-Consciousness in Schelling's Philosophical Development (see: Christian existentialism)
1916 Giovanni Gentile, The Theory of Mind as Pure Act (Developed a version of idealism which is amenable to fascism. see: Actual idealism)
1917 Franz Rosenzweig "The Oldest Systematic Program of German Idealism" (first publication of lost 1797 unsigned document)
1929 Heidegger, Kant and the Problem of Metaphysics
1936 Heidegger, Schelling's Treatise: On the Essence of Human Freedom
1945 Popper, The Open Society and Its Enemies (criticized Hegel's historicism as totalitarian)
1947
Jean Hyppolite, The Genesis and Structure of the Phenomenology of Spirit
Alexandre Kojève,  Introduction to the Reading of Hegel: Lectures on Phenomenology of Spirit
1948 Lukács, The Young Hegel
1955 Walter Kaufmann, Hegel: A Reinterpretation
1963 Adorno, Hegel: Three Studies (see: Frankfurt School)
1966 P.F. Strawson, The Bounds of Sense: An Essay on Immanuel Kant’s Critique of Pure Reason (see: Ordinary language philosophy)
1974 Derrida, Glas (see: Deconstruction, Post-structuralism)
1975 Charles Taylor, Hegel
1992 Francis Fukuyama, The End of History and the Last Man

See also
Objective idealism
Georg Wilhelm Friedrich Hegel bibliography
Johann Wolfgang von Goethe bibliography
Transcendentalism
Hegelianism
Kantianism
Neo-Kantianism

References

External links
Hegel’s Critics at marxists.org

German idealism
German Idealism